Marie-Louise Ester Maude Ekman, née Fuchs, and known during her first marriage under the surname De Geer, and during and after her second as De Geer Bergenstråhle (born 5 November 1944) is a Swedish painter and film director. She is a professor of art and former rector at the Royal University College of Fine Arts, Stockholm.  

During the late 1960s and early 1970s she was among the contributors of a satirical magazine, Puss, in Stockholm. In 1991 at the 26th Guldbagge Awards she won the Creative Achievement award and in 2007 was awarded the prestigious Prince Eugen Medal.

Since 2009 Ekman has been Managing Director of the Royal Dramatic Theatre, Sweden's national stage. 

She was married three times. From 1966 to 1971 she was married to the artist Carl Johan De Geer. She was then married to the director and writer Johan Bergenstråhle (with whom she had two daughters, Johanna and Lovisa) from 1971 to 1980. She was married thirdly to actor and stage director Gösta Ekman from 1989 until his death in 2017.

Filmography
1976 - Hallo Baby
1977 - Mamma, pappa, barn
1979 - Barnförbjudet
1983 - Moderna människor
1985 - Stilleben
1990 - Den hemliga vännen
1991 - Duo Jag (TV-series)
1992 - Vennerman & Winge (TV-series)
1996 - Nu är pappa trött igen
2001 - Puder
2005 - Asta Nilssons sällskap

References

External links

Swedish artists
Swedish film directors
1944 births
Living people
Swedish women film directors
Swedish people of Jewish descent
Recipients of the Prince Eugen Medal